Walla Crag is a fell in the English Lake District, near Keswick. The fell is a short walk from Keswick and overlooks Derwentwater.

Topography
The crag is the terminal cliff on a short ridge running north west from Bleaberry Fell, dropping about 400 ft from the plateau above. Below this are further steep slopes before the gradient slackens on the shore of Derwentwater. The face is heavily wooded — mainly with conifers — almost to the top. The trees continue down through Great Wood to the lake. Walla Crag has one major breach, Lady's Rake.

The summit lies a little way back from the brink, the smooth heather-clad hinterland then dropping to the broad depression of Low Moss. Beyond here the ground rises again to Bleaberry Fell. The southern boundary of the fell is formed by Cat Gill, which flows west from Loss Moss to the lake. The gill separates Walla Crag from the neighbouring Falcon Crag, popular with rock climbers. Brockle Beck flows north from Low Moss, before turning west to enter Derwentwater at Strandshag Bay.

Geology
The crag itself exposes the plagioclase-phyric andesite lavas of the Birker Fell Formation. The summit area is overlain by drift deposits.

Summit

The top is marked by a large cairn and overlooks the islands of northern Derwentwater and the Vale of Keswick. There is also a clear line of sight down Borrowdale to the high fells.

Ascents

Walla Crag makes a half day or evening walk from Keswick and can be climbed via Brockle Beck, Great Wood (a traverse under the face) or Cat Gill. There is also a clear path from Bleaberry Fell.

Height
Fellwalkers of an older generation found the height of Walla Crag an easily memorable 1,234 ft, much as Scafell Pike was once a simple 3,210 ft. More recent work by the Ordnance Survey has now elevated Walla Crag to 1,243 ft.

References

Fells of the Lake District